Tverraksla is a mountain in Sørkapp Land at Spitsbergen, Svalbard. It has a height of 691 m.a.s.l. and is located on the mountain ridge Påskefjella, west of the glacier Chomjakovbreen.

References

Mountains of Spitsbergen